The ECCO Tour Championship was the most prestigious golf tournament on the Denmark-based Danish Golf Tour (titled as the ECCO Tour for sponsorship reasons), being jointly sanctioned by Europe's second-tier Challenge Tour. It ran annually from 2006 to 2012. In 2010, it was held outside Denmark for the first time, when it was hosted at Green Eagle Golf Club in Winsen near Hamburg, Germany.

Winners

Notes

References

External links
Coverage on the Challenge Tour's official site

Former Challenge Tour events
Golf tournaments in Denmark
Golf tournaments in Germany